Baldwin de Redvers, 3rd Earl of Devon (c. 1160–1188) was Earl of Devon from 1162 until his death and was feudal baron of Plympton in Devon. His birth is not attested; but he had a younger brother, and he was invested with the Earldom between the Pipe Rolls of 1185 and 1186, so he should not have been much over twenty-one.

He married Denise the heiress of Raoul, Prince of Déols, lord of Châteauroux and Charenton-du-Cher. After his death, she married André de Chauvigny.

He was succeeded by his brother, Richard de Redvers, 4th Earl of Devon.

Footnotes

References

External links
 Redvers family

1188 deaths
Devon, Baldwin de Redvers, 3rd Earl of
3
Year of birth uncertain
Baldwin